Vice-Admiral Lancelot Ernest Holland,  (13 September 1887 – 24 May 1941) was a Royal Navy officer who commanded the British force in the Battle of the Denmark Strait in May 1941 against the German battleship Bismarck.

Early life
Lancelot Holland was one of six sons and a daughter of a doctor who was also a brewer for the firm Hunt Edmunds. He was born in Middleton Cheney and was raised in the Banbury area. He entered the Royal Navy on 15 May 1902. On leaving HMS Britannia in September 1903, he was drafted to the China Station to join . He served in the Far East until August 1905.

Returning home, Holland saw brief service during the summer of 1908 in the Admiralty surveying ship HMS Research. However, the surveying service proved not to be Holland's forte and three years later on 14 September 1911 the young Lieutenant Holland joined , the Royal Navy's gunnery school at Whale Island, Portsmouth to start the 'Long Course' which would qualify him as a lieutenant (G).

Having qualified as a gunnery lieutenant and gone on to take the advanced gunnery course at Greenwich, Holland spent the First World War in a teaching role aboard HMS Excellent. After the war he was promoted to commander on 31 December 1919 and captain on 30 June 1926.

During the period May 1929 to February 1931, Holland was flag captain to the 2nd Cruiser Squadron, aboard . From May 1931 to September 1932, Holland headed the British Naval Mission to Greece. He was subsequently flag captain aboard the battleship  from July 1934 to July 1935.

Senior officer
After a stint as naval aide-de-camp to King George VI in 1937, Holland became Assistant Chief of Naval Staff and then, following promotion to rear admiral, commander of the 2nd Battle Squadron in January 1939. In September, following the outbreak of the Second World War, he was appointed Rear Admiral Commanding, Channel Force. He then became Admiralty representative at the Air Ministry. He was promoted to vice admiral, backdated to August 1940, after commanding Cruiser Force H during the Battle of Cape Spartivento on 27 November.

Second World War
From November 1940, Holland commanded the 18th Cruiser Squadron, serving in the Mediterranean. During the course of this command he led his cruisers in the Battle of Cape Spartivento on 27 November 1940. By this time, Holland had established himself as a gunnery specialist.

North Atlantic and nemesis

Holland's next assignment was in command of the Battlecruiser Squadron. In May 1941, the new German battleship Bismarck attempted to break out into the North Atlantic, accompanied by the heavy cruiser Prinz Eugen.  Their mission was to attack Allied convoys.  Holland flew his flag aboard Hood, which was accompanied by the new battleship HMS Prince of Wales.  On 22 May, just after midnight, Electra, Achates, Antelope, Anthony, Echo, and Icarus, escorting the Hood and Prince Of Wales, sailed to cover the northern approaches. The intention was that the force would refuel in Hvalfjord, Iceland, and then sail again to watch the Denmark Strait.  On the evening of 23 May, the weather deteriorated. At 20:55, Admiral Holland aboard the Hood signalled the destroyers "If you are unable to maintain this speed I will have to go on without you.  You should follow at your best speed." At 02:15 on the morning of 24 May, the destroyers were ordered to spread out at 15 mile intervals to search to the north.

At about 05:35, the German forces were sighted by the Hood and, shortly afterwards, the Germans sighted the British ships.  In the ensuing Battle of the Denmark Strait the Hood suffered a catastrophic magazine explosion at 06:01 that broke the ship in half; the admiral and all but three of the crew of 1,418 were lost. One of the survivors, Ted Briggs, later stated he last saw Holland sitting in his admiral's chair, in utter dejection, making no attempt to escape from the sinking wreck.

Prince of Wales made her escape with some damage, including a hit on her bridge which killed many of her officers.  One of the salvos from Prince of Wales damaged Bismarcks fuel tanks, and prompted her to make for occupied France.

Holland was posthumously Mentioned in Despatches.

Family

Holland was married to Phyllis and had one son, John, who died of polio at the age of 18 in 1936.

Holland and his family attended the Anglican parish Church of St John the Baptist at Boldre in the New Forest, Hampshire. They had a memorial to their son installed there and later a Hood Memorial Chapel was dedicated. An annual memorial service is held to remember Admiral Holland and the crew of the Hood. A public house in Banbury, The Admiral Holland, was named after him. This pub was demolished in May 2017.

References

Bibliography
 Pursuit: The Sinking of the Bismarck, Ludovic Kennedy. Collins/Fontana, Glasgow, 1975
 The Mighty Hood, Ernle Bradford. Coronet Books (Hodder and Stoughton), Sevenoaks, Kent, England, 1961

External links
 Career history on www.admirals.org.uk
 HMS Hood's Crew: Lancelot Holland

1887 births
1941 deaths
English Anglicans
Royal Navy personnel killed in World War II
Royal Navy admirals of World War II
People from Banbury
Royal Navy officers of World War I
Companions of the Order of the Bath
People lost at sea
Captains who went down with the ship
Military personnel from Northamptonshire